Landon Brown (born February 26, 1987) is an American politician and a Republican member of the Wyoming House of Representatives representing District 9 since January 10, 2017.

Elections

2016
When incumbent Republican Representative David Zwonitzer announced his run for the Wyoming Senate, Brown declared his candidacy for the seat. Brown defeated Kelly Sebastian in the Republican primary with 63% of the vote, and defeated Democrat Mike Weiland in the general election with 58% of the vote.

2018
Brown was unopposed in both the August 18, 2020, Republican primary and the November 6, 2018, general election, winning with 1,482 votes and 2,594 votes, respectively.

2020
Brown was unopposed in both the August 18, 2020, Republican primary and the November 3, 2020, general election, winning with 1,390 and 3,798 votes, respectively.

References

External links
Official page at the Wyoming Legislature
Profile from Ballotpedia

Living people
Republican Party members of the Wyoming House of Representatives
People from Cheyenne, Wyoming
University of Wyoming alumni
Bellevue University alumni
21st-century American politicians
1987 births